Michael John Bytzura (June 18, 1922 – January 24, 1989) was an American professional basketball player. He played in college for Long Island University. During his pro career he played for the Cleveland Allmen Transfers in the National Basketball League during the 1944–45 and 1945–46 seasons, as well for the Pittsburgh Ironmen in the Basketball Association of America in 1946–47.

BAA career statistics

Regular season

External links

1922 births
1989 deaths
American men's basketball players
Basketball players from Pennsylvania
Cleveland Allmen Transfers players
LIU Brooklyn Blackbirds men's basketball players
People from Duquesne, Pennsylvania
Pittsburgh Ironmen players
Forwards (basketball)